Verbena United Methodist Church was the first church constructed in Verbena, Alabama in 1877. Originally part of The Methodist Episcopal Church, South, the church is now a United Methodist congregation. The current minister is Rev. Jody Hill .

History 
In the late 1870s and 1880s many families fled the city of Montgomery, Alabama in fear of Yellow Fever outbreaks. Some stayed in hotels, but many prominent families built summer homes in Verbena. Not only did the new residents build hotels, stores and schools, but also churches. The Methodist Church was the first church constructed in Verbena in 1877, and the original white frame structure is still used as the Sanctuary today.

External links 
Verbena United Methodist Church Website

References

Churches in Chilton County, Alabama
United Methodist churches in Alabama
Churches completed in 1877
Historic district contributing properties in Alabama
Southern Methodist churches in the United States
National Register of Historic Places in Chilton County, Alabama
Churches on the National Register of Historic Places in Alabama
1877 establishments in Alabama